The Nanxi Bridge is a Suspension Bridge over the Yangtze River in Nanxi District, Yibin, Sichuan, China. The bridge carries traffic on the G93 Chengdu–Chongqing Ring Expressway and cost 660 million RMB.

See also
 Yangtze River bridges and tunnels
 List of longest suspension bridge spans
 List of largest bridges in China

References

Bridges in Sichuan
Bridges over the Yangtze River
Bridges completed in 2013
Suspension bridges in China
2013 establishments in China